Stanisław Joachim Sojka (born April 26, 1959 in Żory, Upper Silesia), also known as Stanisław Soyka, is a Polish jazz and pop singer, pianist and composer.

Beginnings 
Sojka began performing as a boy soprano in Gliwice Cathedral Choir, when he was seven years old. At the same time he was also a second-grade violin student at the State Musical School in Gliwice. His musical education was continued at the Music High School in Katowice and completed with a master's degree in arrangement and composing from the Akademia Muzyczna im. K. Szymanowskiego w Katowicach.

Breakthrough 
Soyka made his professional debut on stage in November 1978, when he performed at the National Philharmonic Hall in Warsaw in the "Jazz at the Philharmonic" series. He presented a recital, inspired by classic jazz, soul and R&B, including songs by Ray Charles, Stevie Wonder, The Beatles and George Gershwin, but also traditional Polish Christmas carols and folklore tunes. The concert was recorded and released in 1979 as Soyka's debut album entitled Don't You Cry. In that year Stanisław Soyka won the top prize at Lubelskie Spotkania Jazzowe (Lublin Jazz Conference).

Over the next six yeards he released three more jazz albums and one of religious music. He was named the best Polish jazz vocalist by readers of the magazine Jazz Forum, from 1983 to 1988. In the same period Soyka also recorded some pop songs for Polish Radio, which were later collected on the album Radioaktywny, released in 1989.

Pop career 
In 1986, Soyka signed a two-year record deal with RCA in Germany. There he recorded his first pop and first international album, entitled simply Stanisław Sojka. Among the producers was Harold Faltermeyer. Before the album he also produced Soyka's single "Spirit of the West", recorded for an ad campaign for West cigarettes. The album was a commercial flop, but it was a success in his native Poland. In 1988, Soyka returned to Poland and formed a duet with guitarist Janusz Iwański "Janina" from the Polish jazz group Tie Break. They recorded and performed together until 1994. In 1991, Soyka recorded his most famous and best-selling album, Acoustic, co-produced by Dieter Meier from Yello. It brought hits like Cud niepamięci and Play It Again. In 1992 he was named the Best Polish Star of 1991 by the readers of "Popcorn" magazine for teenagers. His next album Neopositive from 1992 repeated the commercial success of Acoustic, thanks to the huge hit Tolerancja, which became the biggest of his career. In that year he also won the Bursztynowy Słowik – Grand Prix of Sopot International Song Festival. Another album, Radical Graża from 1994, was less successful, as were all his subsequent albums.

New directions 
In 1995, Soyka decided to compose music for poetry and chose William Shakespeare's sonnets, translated into Polish. The album Sonety Shakespeare was released in 1995 and his English version Soyka Sings Shakespeare's Sonnets four years later. Soyka gave the Polish version as a gift to Queen Elizabeth II, during her 1996 visit to Poland. In 2003, he composed music for the poem "Roman Triptych" written by Pope John Paul II and recorded the album Tryptyk rzymski. He presented these songs live in front of the Pope in the Vatican. In 2001 Soyka recorded the last religious album of his career, Polskie pieśni wielkopostne with forgotten Polish Lenten songs. But Soyka did not neglect pop music and between those albums released Nr 17 in 1998, Soykanova in 2002 and album with covers Soyka Sings Love Songs in 2004. In 2007, he formed his new band Soyka Sextet Plus. In 2008 Soyka recorded as a guest artist two songs with rapper Gorzki, including one with Bizarre from D12 and one reggae song with composer and producer Krakowski. Soyka's first studio album in five years, Studio Wąchock, was released in October 2009.

Soyka has won two Fryderyk Awards: as "Best Male Vocalist" of 1994 (on the first ceremony) and for the "Best Poetic Music Album" of 2003.

State decoration

 Krzyż Kawalerski Orderu Odrodzenia Polski, 2009 by Lech Kaczyński (Knight's Cross of the Order of Polonia Restituta)

Discography

Studio albums

Compilation albums

Collaborative albums

Holiday albums

References

External links
 
 Featured Member of Honor in June 2008
Stanisław Soyka at Culture.pl

1956 births
Living people
Polish songwriters
People from Żory
Polish pop singers
Polish jazz singers
English-language singers from Poland
Polish Roman Catholics
20th-century Polish male  singers
21st-century Polish male singers
21st-century Polish singers
Male jazz musicians